The Łubieński family (plural: Łubieńscy; feminine singular: Łubieńska) are Polish nobles who take their name from the village of Łubna-Jarosłaj near Sieradz, in central Poland. They attained magnate status in the 18th century before the Partitions of Poland. One of their number, the reformer and Minister of Justice during Congress Poland, Felix, received the hereditary title of Graf, from king Frederick Wilhelm III of Prussia in 1796. He and his wife, the writer, Tekla Teresa Lubienska had 60 grandchildren. 

Thereafter, their relative economic decline was mitigated in part through their vast land holdings, their fertility and their capacity to participate in church, state, military, economic and industrial affairs. They have also made significant contributions in engineering and the arts. Historically, they are connected to some of the leading families of Poland, among them: Bieliński, Morawski, Potocki, Sobański, Szembek and Szymanowski. Since the 19th century, they are also related to families in England and France.

Family crest

They are members of the Pomian heraldic clan.

Notable figures
 Bernard Łubieński (1846–1933), Polish priest
 Feliks Łubieński (1758–1848), Polish politician and jurist
 Henryk Łubieński (1793–1883), Polish financier and industrialist
 Maciej Łubieński (1572–1652), Polish archbishop
 Maria Magdalena Łubieńska (1833–1920), Polish artist and educator
 Stanisław Łubieński (1573–1640), Polish politician and bishop
 Tekla Teresa Łubieńska (1767–1810), Polish writer and translator
 Teresa Łubieńska (1884–1957), Polish social activist and resistance fighter
 Tomasz Łubieński (1784–1870), Polish brigadier general and senator
 Władysław Aleksander Łubieński (1703–1767), Polish archbishop
 Rula Lenska (born 1947), English-Polish actor

Estates

References

External links 
 Marek Jerzy Minakowski – Genealogia Potomków Sejmu Wielkiego – genealogy service
 
Polish-language surnames
Polish noble families